The 2013 Ukrainian Super Cup became the tenth edition of Ukrainian Super Cup, an annual football match contested by the winners of the previous season's Ukrainian Top League and Ukrainian Cup competitions.

The match was played at the Chornomorets Stadium, Odesa, on 10 July 2013, and contested by league and cup winner Shakhtar Donetsk and cup runner-up Chornomorets Odesa. Shakhtar won it 3–1.

Match

Details

2013
2013–14 in Ukrainian football
FC Chornomorets Odesa matches
FC Shakhtar Donetsk matches
Sport in Odesa